Matthew Gray (18 April 1907–1985) was an English footballer who played in the Football League for Oldham Athletic.

References

1907 births
1985 deaths
English footballers
Association football forwards
English Football League players
Atherton F.C. players
Oldham Athletic A.F.C. players